My Dead Boyfriend is a 2016 American comedy film directed by Anthony Edwards and starring Heather Graham, Katherine Moennig, Scott Michael Foster, and John Corbett. The film is based on Arthur Nersesian's 2000 novel Dogrun.

It was released on November 3, 2016 by Orion Pictures and Momentum Pictures.

Plot
Mary's life has been defined by a string of temp jobs and a half-hearted attempt to become a writer, but all that changes when she comes home to find her couch potato boyfriend dead in front of the TV set.

Cast
 Heather Graham as Mary McCrawley
 Scott Michael Foster as Howard
 Katherine Moennig as Zoey Bryant
 Griffin Dunne as Kaleb Giles
 John Corbett as Primo Schultz
 Martha Millan as Sue Watt
 Lizzi Bougatsos as Marilyn
 Angela Featherstone as Norma
 Viola Harris as Ms. Schulz
 Gina Gershon as Helene
 Andre Ward as Miss Vicki
 Edwin Cahill as Ted
 Isa McCutcheon as Herman
 Bailey Edwards as Jeff
 Salma Valentina as Frankie
 Jennifer Regan as Minnie
 Tina Huang as Stripper Mimi

Reception
The film received negative reviews and has a 0% rating on Rotten Tomatoes based on reviews from 11 critics. On Metacritic the film has a score of 25% based on reviews from 6 critics.

Neil Genzlinger of The New York Times wrote that the film "desperately tries to look and sound like a quirky indie hit, but that’s not an achievable goal when you have an unlikable lead character indifferently rendered by a name star."

Frank Scheck of The Hollywood Reporter wrote that the film "never achieves a consistent narrative or stylistic tone. Instead, it relies far too heavily on the charms of its wide-eyed star, who, despite her best efforts, can't overcome the fact that her role should be played by a much younger actress. Twenty years ago, this comedy might have been a slightly amusing diversion. Now it just exudes an air of sweaty desperation."

Christy Lemire of RogerEbert.com gave the film one star.

References

External links
 
 

2016 films
American comedy films
Films based on American novels
Orion Pictures films
2016 comedy films
2010s English-language films
2010s American films